Pio V. Corpus, officially the Municipality of Pio V. Corpus  is a 4th class municipality in the province of Masbate, Philippines. According to the 2020 census, it has a population of 23,744 people.

History
Pio V. Corpus was formerly known as Limbuhan. In 1951, the barrios of Limbuhan, Guindawahan, Palho, Casabangan, Salvacion, Alegria, Tanque, Bunducan, Bugtong, and Cabangrayan were separated from the town of Cataingan and created into the town of Limbuhan. The town got its current name in 1954, and was named after the former Congressman and Governor, Pio Villaluz Corpus (1883–1944). Born on July 11, 1883, in Nueva Ecija, he migrated to Masbate and he would later serve in the war time Japanese sponsored Government and was unfortunately assassinated by the Japanese Intelligence due to mistrust on February 7, 1944, in Manila. Its first mayor was Daniel Señoron.

Geography

Barangays

Pio V. Corpus is politically subdivided into 18 barangays. Sitio Bugang was converted into a barrio in 1957.
 Alegria
 Buenasuerte
 Bugang
 Bugtong
 Bunducan
 Cabangrayan
 Calongongan
 Casabangan
 Guindawahan
 Labigan
 Lampuyang
 Mabuhay
 Palho
 Poblacion
 Salvacion
 Tanque
 Tubigan
 Tubog

Climate

Demographics

Economy

See also
List of renamed cities and municipalities in the Philippines

References

External links
 [ Philippine Standard Geographic Code]
Philippine Census Information
Local Governance Performance Management System

Municipalities of Masbate